Bruce Edward George Mason  (28 September 1921 – 31 December 1982) was a significant playwright in New Zealand who wrote 34 plays and influenced the cultural landscape of the country through his contribution to theatre. In 1980, he was appointed a Commander of the Order of the British Empire.
The Bruce Mason Playwriting Award, one of the most important playwrighting accolades in New Zealand, is named in his honour. Mason was also an actor, critic, and fiction writer.

Mason's most well known play is The End of the Golden Weather, a classic work in New Zealand theatre, which he performed solo more than 500 times in many New Zealand towns. It was made into a feature film directed by Ian Mune in 1991. Another significant play is The Pohutukawa Tree written during the 1950s and 1960s. The Pohutukawa Tree was Mason's first major success and explored Māori and Pākehā themes, a common thread in most of his works. Theatre was an avenue for Mason to highlight social and political issues in New Zealand society. He translated Chekhov's The Cherry Orchard for radio in 1960. His works of solo theatre was collected under the title Bruce Mason Solo (1981) and included The End of the Golden Weather. Published in 1987 was The Healing Arch, a cycle of five plays, including The Pohutukawa Tree and Hongi, which focus on Māori culture post European contact.

Background
Mason was born in Wellington, the country's capital. At the age of 5, his family moved to Takapuna. He attended Victoria University College where he took part in drama. In 1945, he graduated with a B.A. He served in the New Zealand Army (1941–1943) and the Naval Volunteer Reserve (1943–1945). He later worked for the New Zealand Forest Service (1951–1957). He edited the Māori news magazine Te Ao Hou (1960–1961), a culturally significant publication. He was a co-founder of Downstage Theatre, New Zealand's first professional theatre in 1964 and wrote a weekly column Music on the Air for the New Zealand Listener from 1964 to 1969. He was also a theatre critic for the capital's newspapers from the 1950s to the 1980s.

Honours and awards
In 1977, Mason was awarded an honorary Doctor of Literature degree by Victoria University of Wellington. In the 1980 New Year Honours, he was appointed a Commander of the Order of the British Empire, for services to literature and the arts.

Personal life
Mason met his wife Diana while studying at Victoria University College in 1939. A noted obstetrician specialising in women's health, she shared his interest in the arts. They had three children, Belinda, Julian and Rebecca.

Death
Bruce Mason died in 1982 from cancer. His wife Diana Mason died in June 2007, nearly 25 years after her husband's death.

Legacy

Mason's plays are studied at schools and universities. The Bruce Mason Centre, a major arts and theatre venue in Auckland is also named after him. The centre was opened in 1996 and contains a 1164-seat auditorium. The Promenade Cafe displays Bruce Mason memorabilia, including his original desk and typewriter.

In 2009, The Pohutukawa Tree was staged by Auckland Theatre Company, directed by Colin McColl and starring Rena Owen and Stuart Devenie.

The Bruce Mason Playwriting Award has been running since 1983 currently managed by Playmarket, the FAME Trust (Fund for Acting and Musical Endeavours) and Downstage Theatre Society to award an annual $10,000 to an outstanding emerging New Zealand playwright. Previous winners include several celebrated writers from New Zealand including Hone Kouka, Briar Grace-Smith, Jo Randerson, Victor Rodger, Arthur Meek, Sam Brooks and Mīria George.

Plays
The Evening Paper 1953
The Bonds of Love 1953
The Licensed Victualler 1954
The Verdict 1955
A Case in Point 1957
Birds in the Wilderness 1958
The End of the Golden Weather (first performed in 1959)
The Pohutukawa Tree 1960, revised 1963 (first performed at a theatre workshop in 1957)
The Light Enlarging 1963
We Don't Want Your Sort Here 1963
To Russia with Love 1965
The Waters of Silence 1965
The Hand on the Rail 1967
Swan Song 1967
Hongi 1968, published 1974
Awatea 1969
Zero Inn 1970
Not Christmas, but Guy Fawkes 1976
Courting Blackbird 1976
Blood of the Lamb 1981
Daphne and Chloe 1982 (televised 1983)
Do Not Go Gentle 1982 (televised 1983)
The Garlick Thrust 1982 (televised 1983)
Rise and Shine 1982

Further reading 
Mason, Bruce (1973). New Zealand drama: a parade of forms and a history. Wellington: Price Milburn.

Mason, Bruce (1980). Beginnings. (Ed, Robin Dudding). Wellington, pp. 70-77.

Mason, Bruce (1986). Every kind of weather. (Ed. David Dowling). Wellington: Reed Methuen.

Dowling, David (1981). "Bruce Mason". Landfall, no. 138, pp. 162-167.

Dowling, David (1982). Introducing Bruce Mason. Auckland.

McNaughton, Howard (1973). "The plays of Bruce Mason". Landfall no. 106, pp. 102-138.

McNaughton, Howard (1976). Bruce Mason: New Zealand writers and their work. Wellington.

Smythe, John (2016). The Plays of Bruce Mason: A survey. Wellington: Playmarket-Victoria University Press.

References

External links

The End of the Golden Weather at  IMDb website
The Bruce Mason Centre, Takapuna

New Zealand male dramatists and playwrights
1921 births
1982 deaths
Victoria University of Wellington alumni
Deaths from cancer in New Zealand
New Zealand military personnel of World War II
20th-century New Zealand dramatists and playwrights
New Zealand Commanders of the Order of the British Empire
20th-century New Zealand male writers